Taking or takings may refer to:

 Theft, illicit taking
 The acquisition of land under eminent domain
 Take (hunting) or taking, an action that adversely affects a species
 Kidnapping of persons

See also

 
 
 
 Take (disambiguation)
 Taken (disambiguation)
 Took (disambiguation)
 Acquisition (disambiguation)
 Expropriation
 Resumption (disambiguation)